Silmarils was a French computer game software company founded in 1987 by Louis-Marie and André Rocques. It produced games for PC, Amiga, Amstrad CPC, Macintosh, Atari ST and Atari Falcon.

The company is most closely associated with its Ishar series. Crystals of Arborea was one of the first games to offer real-time 3D environment and a large world with very few limits on movement. The company went bankrupt in 2003, and in 2004 the Rocques brothers and another former Silmarils member, Pascal Einsweiler, founded a new studio called Eversim, specializing in political strategy games.

It was named after J. R. R. Tolkien's Silmarils.

Games
1987
Manhattan Dealers
1988
Mad Show
1989
Le Fetiche Maya
Targhan (planned for Sega Genesis)
Windsurf Willy
1990
Colorado (planned for Sega Genesis)
Crystals of Arborea
Star Blade (planned for Sega Genesis)
1991
Boston Bomb Club
Metal Mutant
Storm Master
Xyphoes Fantasy
1992
Bunny Bricks
Ishar I: Legend of the Fortress
1993
Ishar II: Messengers of Doom
Transarctica
1994
Robinson's Requiem
Ishar 3: The Seven Gates of Infinity
1996
Deus
1997
Time Warriors
1998
Asghan: The Dragon Slayer
2001
Arabian Nights
Les Visiteurs: La Relique de Sainte Rolande
2003
Inspector Gadget: Mad Robots Invasion
unknown
Asghan 2

References

External links

Video game companies established in 1987
Video game companies disestablished in 2003
Defunct video game companies of France
Things named after Tolkien works